Tuineje is a town and a municipality in the southern part of the island of Fuerteventura in the Province of Las Palmas, Canary Islands, Spain. The population is 13,946 (2013), and the area is 275.94 km2. The largest town in the municipality is Gran Tarajal, on the south coast.

History
Tuineje was the site of the two battles between the locals and English privateers in 1740.

Notable people
Aridane Hernández (born 1989), professional footballer

Gallery

See also

List of municipalities in Las Palmas

References

Municipalities in Fuerteventura